Thomas Birch Florence (January 26, 1812 – July 3, 1875) was a Democratic member of the U.S. House of Representatives from Pennsylvania.

Biography
Thomas B. Florence born in Philadelphia, Pennsylvania. He learned the hatter's trade and engaged in that business in 1833. He was engaged in the newspaper business. He was an unsuccessful Democratic candidate for election in 1846 and 1848.

Florence was elected as a Democrat to the Thirty-second and to the four succeeding Congresses. After leaving Congress edited and published the Constitutional Union in Washington, D.C., and subsequently became the proprietor of the Sunday Gazette.

He was an unsuccessful candidate in his old district for election in 1868 and in 1874. He died in Washington, D.C. in 1875. He was originally buried in Monument Cemetery in Philadelphia which was closed in 1956 and his remains moved to Lawnview Memorial Park in Rockledge, Pennsylvania.

References

 
 The Political Graveyard

1812 births
1875 deaths
Politicians from Philadelphia
19th-century American newspaper publishers (people)
American milliners
Burials at Lawnview Memorial Park
Burials at Monument Cemetery
Democratic Party members of the United States House of Representatives from Pennsylvania
19th-century American journalists
American male journalists
19th-century American male writers
19th-century American politicians
Journalists from Pennsylvania